The Municipality of Semič is a municipality in Slovenia in the traditional region of White Carniola in southeastern Slovenia. The municipality is included in the Southeast Slovenia Statistical Region. Its seat is the settlement of Semič.

Settlements

In addition to the municipal seat of Semič, the municipality also includes the following settlements:

 Blatnik pri Črmošnjicah
 Brezje pri Rožnem Dolu
 Brezje pri Vinjem Vrhu
 Brezova Reber
 Brezovica pri Črmošnjicah
 Brstovec
 Cerovec pri Črešnjevcu
 Črešnjevec pri Semiču
 Črmošnjice
 Gaber pri Črmošnjicah
 Gornje Laze
 Gradnik
 Hrib pri Cerovcu
 Hrib pri Rožnem Dolu
 Kal
 Komarna Vas
 Krupa
 Krvavčji Vrh
 Lipovec
 Maline pri Štrekljevcu
 Mašelj
 Moverna Vas
 Nestoplja Vas
 Omota
 Oskoršnica
 Osojnik
 Planina
 Podreber
 Potoki
 Praproče
 Praprot
 Preloge
 Pribišje
 Pugled
 Rožni Dol
 Sela pri Vrčicah
 Sodji Vrh
 Sovinek
 Sredgora
 Srednja Vas
 Starihov Vrh
 Stranska Vas pri Semiču
 Štrekljevec
 Trebnji Vrh
 Vinji Vrh pri Semiču
 Vrčice

References

External links
 
 Municipality of Semič website

Semic
Semic
1994 establishments in Slovenia